Bromley by-election may refer to:

 1919 Bromley by-election
 1930 Bromley by-election
 1945 Bromley by-election

See also 

 2006 Bromley and Chislehurst by-election